Oman competed at the 2004 Summer Paralympics in Athens, Greece. The team included two athletes, both of them men. The team did not win any medals.

Sports

Powerlifting

Men

See also
Oman at the Paralympics
Oman at the 2004 Summer Olympics

References 

Nations at the 2004 Summer Paralympics
2004
Summer Paralympics